Whetten is a surname. Notable people with the surname include:

David A. Whetten (born 1946), American organizational theorist
Nathan Whetten (1900–1984), American sociologist and academic administrator

See also
Whitten (surname)

English-language surnames